Don Travis (21 January 1924 - 2002) was a footballer who played as a centre forward in the Football League for West Ham United, Southend United, Accrington Stanley, Crewe Alexandra, Oldham Athletic and Chester.

Career
Travis started his career with West Ham United. On 16 February 1946, playing in the Wartime League, Travis scored four goals against Plymouth Argyle. He had already scored four goals on his debut for the reserves and is the only West Ham player to score four on his debut for both teams.

References

1924 births
2002 deaths
Footballers from Manchester
Association football forwards
English footballers
Blackpool F.C. players
West Ham United F.C. players
Southend United F.C. players
Accrington Stanley F.C. (1891) players
Crewe Alexandra F.C. players
Oldham Athletic A.F.C. players
Chester City F.C. players
Yeovil Town F.C. players
English Football League players